Maple Leaf is the name of two communities in Ontario:
Maple Leaf, a community within Hastings Highlands, Ontario
Maple Leaf, Toronto, a community within North York, Ontario